Kafi is a raga in Hindustani classical music. It corresponds to Kharaharapriya in Carnatic music and Dorian mode in Western music

Vishnu Narayan Bhatkhande classified most ragas into ten Thaats. Kafi Thaat is one of them. The raga Kafi is the principal raga of its Thaat. According to Bhatkhande, its name first appears in the Raga Tarangini of Lochana Pandit, who lived in the Mithila district around the 15th century CE.

Kafi has a direct lineage with the folk music of India. Folk music in Tappa, Hori, Dadra, Kirtan and Bhajans from different parts of India have been composed in this raga.

Many variations of Kafi exist. Contamination with vivadi swaras is common. This mixing has given rise to Mishra Kafi. Hence, a pure form of Kafi is seldom heard.

Description

Varna 
Kafi is a sampoorna-sampoorna or heptatonic raga, with komal (half a note down) Gandhar (ga) and Nishad (ni). This is also referred to as the Bhairavi of night. Both Shuddha Nishad & Gandhar are occasionally used. The atmosphere created is most suitable for both types of Shringar (Separation & Union) and hence many Thumri & Hori compositions are sung in this Raag.

Aroha
Sa Re Ga Ma Pa Dha Ni Ṡa

(Ga and Ni are komal swaras). Dot above signifies the high octave, dot below signifies the low octave.

Avarohana 
Ṡa Ni Dha Pa Ma Ga Re Sa 

(Ga and Ni are komal swaras).

Vadi and Samavadi 
Pancham (Pa) is the vadi swara and Sadaj (Sa) is the samavadi swara.

Pakad 
A typical improvisation of Kafi starts as M P D P M g R, g R S, n. D. S

The phrases below and termination in R are characteristic.

S R g M P D n

S, R g M P, M P D (M) g

Chalan 
The typical chalan can be illustrated as:

S S R R g g M M
P - - D M P g R
R n D n P D M P
S n D P M G R S.

M P D D n S - S
R g R S N D S -
S R S n D n D P
M P D P g - R -
R n D n P D M P
S n D P M g R S

Variants 
 Shuddha Kafi
 Sindhura Kafi
 Zilaf Kafi
 Kafi Kanada

Organization and relationships 
Various ragas, such as Bhimpalasi, Bageshree, Kafi Kanada, Bahar, and Brindabani Sarang are associated with this raga. Important tributaries of this raga include Sindhura, Barwa, Deshi, Neelambari and Pilu.

In Western Classical Music, Kafi corresponds to the modern Dorian Mode.

Behavior

Samay (Time) 
Raat ka dvitiya prahar or evening 9-12

Seasonality 
The raga is performed during any season.

Rasa 
The principal rasa for this raga is sringara.

Important recordings 
 Ulhas Kashalkar, Raga Kafi (Concert), 2001;
 Shobha Gurtu, Thumri, Raga Kafi, 1987;
 Siddheshwari Devi, Thumri, Raga Kafi, 1983;
 Debashish Bhattacharya, Raga Mishra Kafi, 1996;
 Ustad Bahadur Khan, Raga Kafi, 1987;

Film Songs

Language:Tamil 
Note that the following songs are composed in Kharaharapriya, the equivalent of raga Kafi in Carnatic music.

References 

 Hindustani Sangeet Paddhati and his concise commentary, A Comparative Study of Some of the Leading Music Systems of the 15th, 16, 17th, & 18th Centuries by Vishnu Narayan Bhatkhande.
 http://www.tanarang.com/english/kafi_eng.htm

See also

 Kafi (disambiguation)

Hindustani ragas